Lawrence Brown Jr. (born September 19, 1947) is an American former professional football player in the National Football League (NFL) who played running back for the Washington Redskins from 1969 to 1976.

Raised in nearby Pittsburgh, Pennsylvania, he graduated from Schenley High School, his original interest being in baseball.  He later developed an overriding interest in football and played college football in Kansas at Dodge City Community College and Kansas State University in Manhattan.

Professional career
Brown's eight-year professional career was spent exclusively with the Washington Redskins. The team had selected him as an afterthought, in the eighth round of the 1969 NFL/AFL draft in January. Though Washington was primarily a passing team, starring All-Pro quarterback Sonny Jurgensen, and in 1967, they had the NFL's first (Charley Taylor), second (tight end Jerry Smith) and fourth ranked receivers in passes caught, they needed a productive rusher. Brown was an unlikely candidate, having served as a blocking back for Cornelius Davis at Kansas State, where the sophomore quarterback, Lynn Dickey, broke all school passing records. Brown had not been widely recruited in high school. His strongest feeler came from Howard University in Washington, D.C., but upon visiting its campus, he noted the lopsided football scores against the university's teams posted on past schedules in the school's athletic building.

In 1969, newly arrived Redskins head coach Vince Lombardi noticed Brown, a talented but underperforming running back. Tests ordered by Lombardi determined that Brown was hearing-impaired in one ear, and that he was watching for the lineman to move rather than listening to the quarterback's snap count. After getting approval from the league Commissioner's office, Lombardi had Brown's helmet fitted with an ear-piece that relayed quarterback Sonny Jurgensen's snap counts, improving Brown's responsiveness, thus allowing him to hit the hole very quickly. Brown's other rookie obstacle was his training camp propensity to fumble. Lombardi ordered Brown to carry a football everywhere he went at the team's training camp in Carlisle, Pennsylvania.

Brown had an impressive rookie season during which Brown was largely the reason Washington posted a record of 7-5-2, their first winning record since 1955. He had rushed for 888 yards, a team record. Lombardi died of cancer during the preseason of Brown's second year. Brown went to four consecutive Pro Bowls during his first four seasons and led the Redskins to their Super Bowl VII appearance against the "perfect season" Miami Dolphins in January 1973. He was noted for his courageous running style despite his relatively small size, courage he attributed to having been raised on the tough streets of Pittsburgh's Hill District, and playing tackle football in those streets. He was also noted for his abilities to break tackles, and gain yardage after contact, which announcers called "second effort".

He finished in the top five of the league for rushes five times, rushing yards three times, yards from scrimmage three times and total touchdowns twice. Brown was the first Redskins running back to gain more than 1,000 yards in a single season. He achieved that feat twice in a career that ran from 1969 to 1976. In an eight-year career, Brown was selected to play in the Pro Bowl in 1969, 1970, 1971, and 1972. He has been voted one of the 70 Greatest Redskins of All Time. He was selected as the DC Touchdown Club NFL Player of the Year in 1972.

Brown carried the ball 1,530 times in his career gaining 5,875 yards. His best seasons were in 1972 when he gained 1,216 yards and in 1970 when he gained 1,125 yards. He rushed for 100 yards or more 21 times and rushed for 100 yards or more in six games in 1970 and six games in 1972. He also scored four rushing touchdowns in one game against the Eagles on December 16, 1973. On October 29, 1972, he ran for 190 yards in a game against the New York Giants. Brown wrote an autobiography entitled "I'll Always Get Up".

Vince Lombardi figured out that Brown might have a hearing problem, one day when he was watching game film in slow motion. He noticed that Brown was reacting late to the snap, and had Brown take a hearing examination. It turned out Brown was deaf in one ear, and Lombardi got permission from the NFL Commissioner to install a hearing aid in Brown's helmet.

Brown's career was cut short due to numerous injuries, and his jersey number, 43, while not officially retired, has not been issued to any other Washington player since his retirement.

The Professional Football Researchers Association named Brown to the PFRA Hall of Very Good Class of 2014.

Post-football career

Brown is currently a Vice President of NAI Michael Commercial Real Estate Services. After retiring from football in 1976, he was employed at E.F. Hutton as a Personal Financial Management Advisor.

For 12 years, Brown was employed by Xerox Corporation with responsibilities for business and community relations.

He has served on the Board of Directors of Mellon Bank (MD), the Board of Visitors of George Mason University, the Board of Associates of Gallaudet University the Board of Directors of the Greater Washington, D.C. Sports Authority, and a Delegate to Japan with the American Council of Young Political Leaders.

Charitable activities

Brown has been active over many years in charitable activities for the Redskins and other non-profit organizations in the Washington, D.C. area, including the Prince George's County Special Olympics the National Council on Disability, Friends of the National Zoo Advisory Committee, the Coalition for the Homeless, the Capital Children's Museum, and the Washington Redskins Charity Golf Classic.

He makes regular appearances at Redskins alumni events.

References

External links
 

1947 births
Living people
American football running backs
Kansas State Wildcats football players
Washington Redskins players
EF Hutton people
Eastern Conference Pro Bowl players
National Conference Pro Bowl players
Schenley High School alumni
People from Clairton, Pennsylvania
Players of American football from Pennsylvania
Dodge City Conquistadors football players
National Football League Offensive Player of the Year Award winners
National Football League Most Valuable Player Award winners